The 2011 Trofeo Paolo Corazzi was a professional tennis tournament played on hard courts. It was the eighth edition of the tournament which was part of the 2011 ATP Challenger Tour. It took place in Cremona, Italy between 16 and 22 May 2011.

ATP entrants

Seeds

 Rankings are as of May 9, 2011.

Other entrants
The following players received wildcards into the singles main draw:
  Federico Gaio
  Laurynas Grigelis
  Giuseppe Menga
  Walter Trusendi

The following players received entry from the qualifying draw:
  Richard Bloomfield
  Pierre-Ludovic Duclos
  Roko Karanušić
  Alexander Sadecky (as a Lucky loser)
  Phillip Simmonds

Champions

Singles

 Igor Kunitsyn def.  Rainer Schüttler, 6–2, 7–6(2)

Doubles

 Treat Conrad Huey /  Purav Raja def.  Tomasz Bednarek /  Mateusz Kowalczyk, 6–1, 6–2

External links
Official Website
ITF Search
ATP official site

Trofeo Paolo Corazzi
Trofeo Paolo Corazzi